Épagny Metz-Tessy is a commune in the Haute-Savoie department of southeastern France. The municipality was established on 1 January 2016 and consists of the former communes of Épagny and Metz-Tessy. It is part of the urban area of Annecy.

Population

See also 
Communes of the Haute-Savoie department

References 

Communes of Haute-Savoie
Populated places established in 2016